Namibia is a one party dominant state with the South-West Africa People's Organisation in power. Opposition parties are allowed, but are widely considered to have no real chance of gaining power.  In Namibian politics, ethnicity plays a significant role in party affiliation and voting behaviour.  Some parties are dominated by single ethnic groups; SWAPO itself, its government, and administration, is pre-dominantly Ovambo.

Parties with parliamentary seats
Parties with seats in the National Assembly of Namibia after the 2019 elections:

Unrepresented parties
The following parties contested the 2019 parliamentary elections but did not gain a seat, in the order of votes obtained:

 Congress of Democrats (CoD)
 National Democratic Party (NDP). The NDP gained a seat in the Katima Mulilo town council in the 2020 local authority election.
 Workers Revolutionary Party (WRP)
 National Patriotic Front (NPF)

New parties
The following parties were established after the last parliamentary elections in 2019:
 Independent Patriots for Change (IPC). In 2020 it won the municipal elections in the commercial hubs Walvis Bay and Swakopmund, and 29 seats in different constituencies in Northern Namibia, hitherto considered an impenetrable SWAPO stronghold.
 National Empowerment Fighting Corruption (NEFC)

Parties of local relevance

The following parties did not contest the 2019 general elections but took part in the 2020 local authority election, and gained seats:
 Gobabis Residents' Association, 1 seat in Gobabis
 Karibib Ratepayers Association, 1 seat in Karibib
 Monitor Action Group, 1 seat in Outjo
 Okahandja Rate Payers Association, 1 seat in Okahandja
 Omaruru Community Development Association, 1 seat in Omaruru
 Rehoboth Independent Town Management Association, 1 seat in Rehoboth
 United People's Movement (UPM), 1 seat in Rehoboth
 Rundu Concerned Citizens Association, 1 seat in Rundu
 Rundu Urban Community Association, 1 seat in Rundu
 Swakopmund Residents Association, 2 seats in Swakopmund
 Joint Walvis Bay Residents Association, 1 seat in Walvis Bay
 The Affirmative Repositioning (AR) movement was registered for the 2020 local elections as an association in the urban centres of Windhoek, Walvis Bay and Swakopmund. It gained two seats in the Windhoek municipality and won the 2020 mayoral election with Job Amupanda.

Defunct parties

National parties
 Communist Party of Namibia
 Democratic Action for Namas
 Democratic Party of Namibia (DPN)
 Namibia African People's Democratic Organisation
 Namibian Democratic Movement for Change
 National Progressive Party
 Riemvasmaak United Party
 United Nama Independence People's Party
 United Namib Independence Party
 United Namibia People's Party

Local parties
 Civic Association of Henties Bay

Banned parties
United Democratic Party

References

Namibia
 
Political parties
Political parties
Namibia